Bărbătești may refer to several places in Romania:

 Bărbătești, Gorj, a commune in Gorj County
 Bărbătești, Vâlcea, a commune in Vâlcea County
 Bărbătești, a village in Cocu Commune, Argeș County
 Bărbătești, a village in Cucuteni Commune, Iași County